This is a list of 132 genera in the family Therevidae, stiletto flies.

Therevidae genera

 Acantothereva  c g
 Acathrito  c g
 Acatopygia  c g
 Acraspisa  c g
 Acraspisoides  c g
 Acrosathe Irwin & Lyneborg, 1981 i c g b
 Actenomeros  c g
 Actorthia  c g
 Acupalpa  c g
 Agapophytus  c g
 Ambradolon Metz & Irwin, 2000 g
 Ammonaios Irwin & Lyneborg, 1981 i c g b
 Ammothereva  c g
 Amplisegmentum  c g
 Anabarhynchus  c g
 Anolinga  c g
 Apenniverpa  c g
 Araeopus Spinola, 1839 i c g
 Arctogephyra Hauser, 2007 g
 Arenigena Irwin & Lyneborg, 1981 i c g b
 Argolepida  c g
 Aristothereva  c g
 Ataenogera  i c g
 Baryphora  c g
 Belonalys  c g
 Bibio  i c g
 Bonjeania  c g
 Brachylinga Irwin & Lyneborg, 1981 i c g b
 Braunsophila  c g
 Breviperna Irwin, 1977 i c g b
 Bugulaverpa  c g
 Caenophthalmus  c g
 Calophytus  c g
 Ceratosathe  c g
 Chromolepida Cole, 1923 i c g b
 Chrysanthemyia  c g
 Cionophora  c g
 Cliorismia  c g
 Cochlodactyla  c g
 Coleiana  c g
 Collessiama Lambkin, 2013 g
 Cyclotelus Walker, 1850 i c g b
 Delphacura  c g
 Dialineura  i c g
 Dichoglena  i c g
 Dimassus Walker, 1850 g
 Distostylus  c g
 Ectinorhynchus  c g
 Efflatouniella  c g
 Elcaribe  c g
 Entesia  c g
 Euphycus  c g
 Eupsilocephala  c g
 Glaesorthactia Hennig, 1967 g
 Hemigephyra  c g
 Henicomyia Coquillett, 1898 i c g b
 Hermannula  c g
 Hoplosathe  c g
 Iberotelus  c g
 Insulatitan  c g
 Irwiniella  c g
 Jeanchazeauia  c g
 Johnmannia  c g
 Kroeberiella Hauser, 2007 g
 Laxotela  c g
 Lindneria  c g
 Litolinga Irwin & Lyneborg, 1981 i c g b
 Lyneborgia  c g
 Lysilinga Irwin & Lyneborg, 1981 i c g b
 Manestella  c g
 Medomega Winterton & Lambkin, 2012 g
 Megalinga  i c g
 Megapalla  c g
 Megathereva  c g
 Melanacrosathe  c g
 Melanothereva  i c g
 Microgephyra  c g
 Microthereva  c g
 Nanexila  c g
 Nebritus Coquillett, 1894 i c g b
 Neodialineura  c g
 Neophycus  c g
 Neotabuda  c g
 Neotherevella  c g
 Nesonana  c g
 Nigranitida  c g
 Notiothereva  c g
 Orthactia  c g
 Ozodiceromya  i c g
 Ozodiceromyia  b
 Pachyrrhiza  c g
 Palaeopherocera Hauser & Irwin, 2005 g b
 Pallicephala  i c g
 Pandivirilia Irwin & Lyneborg, 1981 i c g b
 Parapherocera  i c g
 Parapsilocephala  c g
 Patanothrix  c g
 Penniverpa Irwin & Lyneborg, 1981 i c g b
 Pentheria  c g
 Peralia  c g
 Peratrimera Hauser & Irwin, 2005 g
 Pherocera Cole, 1923 i c g b
 Phycus  i c g
 Pipinnipons  c g
 Procyclotelus  c g
 Protothereva  c g
 Pseudothereva  c g
 Psilocephala  i c g
 Ptilotophallos  c g
 Rhagioforma  i c g
 Ruppellia  c g
 Salentia  c g
 Salwaea Winterton, Hauser & Badrawy, 2012 g
 Schlingeria  i c g
 Schoutedenomyia  c g
 Sidarena  g
 Sigalopella  c g
 Sinothereva  c g
 Spinalobus  c g
 Spiracolis  c g
 Spiriverpa Irwin & Lyneborg, 1981 i c g b
 Squamopygia  c g
 Stenogephyra  c g
 Stenopomyia  c g
 Stenosathe  c g
 Tabuda Walker, 1852 i c g b
 Tabudamima  i c g
 Taenogera  c g
 Taenogerella  c g
 Thereva Latreille, 1797 i c g b
 Vomerina  c g
 Winthemmyia  c g
 Xestomyza  c g
 Xestomyzina  c g
 Zelothrix  g

Data sources: i = ITIS, c = Catalogue of Life, g = GBIF, b = Bugguide.net

References